Yoliswa Nomampondomise Yako (born 22 March 1983) is a South African politician from the Eastern Cape who serves as a Member of the National Assembly of South Africa. She took office as an MP on 3 September 2018. Yako was previously a PR councillor of the Nelson Mandela Bay Metropolitan Municipality and the chairperson of the municipality's Municipal Public Accounts Committee (MPAC). Yako is a member of the Economic Freedom Fighters.

Background
Yako was born on 22 March 1983. She joined the Economic Freedom Fighters in 2014 and was elected as a councillor of the Nelson Mandela Bay Metropolitan Municipality in August 2016. In 2018, she was elected chairperson of the municipality's Municipal Public Accounts Committee (MPAC).

Parliamentary career

On 3 September 2018, Yako was sworn in as a Member of the National Assembly of South Africa for the EFF, succeeding Vuyokazi Ketabahle. Nosipho Ncana replaced her as a Nelson Mandela Bay councillor. Yako was assigned to the Portfolio Committee on Mineral Resources. She delivered her maiden speech on the #FeesMustFall activists, who were either imprisoned or expelled from university.

Yako was elected to a full term as an MP in May 2019. On 27 June 2019, she received her new committee assignments.

Committee assignments

Current committee assignments
Portfolio Committee on Trade and Industry
Portfolio Committee on Basic Education (Alternate Member)

Past committee assignments
Portfolio Committee on Mineral Resources

References

External links
Yoliswa Nomampondomise Yako at Parliament of South Africa

Living people
1983 births
Members of the National Assembly of South Africa
Xhosa people
People from the Eastern Cape
People from Port Elizabeth
Women members of the National Assembly of South Africa
Economic Freedom Fighters politicians